Gaber Yacout El-Soury (died 2 July 1987) was an Egyptian football defender who played for Egypt in the 1934 FIFA World Cup. He also competed in the men's tournament at the 1928 Summer Olympics.

References

External links
 

Year of birth missing
1987 deaths
Egyptian footballers
Egypt international footballers
Association football defenders
1934 FIFA World Cup players
Olympic footballers of Egypt
Footballers at the 1928 Summer Olympics